STS-81 was a January 1997 Space Shuttle Atlantis mission to the Mir space station.

Crew

Mission highlights

STS-81 was the fifth of nine planned missions to Mir and the second one involving an exchange of U.S. astronauts. Astronaut John Blaha, who had been on Mir since 19 September 1996, was replaced by astronaut Jerry Linenger. Linenger spent more than four months on Mir. He returned to Earth on Space Shuttle Mission STS-84.

Atlantis carried the SPACEHAB double module providing additional middeck locker space for secondary experiments. During the five days of docked operations with Mir, the crews transferred water and supplies from one spacecraft to the other. A spacewalk by Linenger and one of his Russian cosmonaut crewmates occurred after the departure of Atlantis.

The STS-81 mission included several experiments in the fields of advanced technology, Earth sciences, fundamental biology, human life sciences, microgravity, and space sciences. It was hoped that data would supply insight for the planning and development of the International Space Station, Earth-based sciences of human and biological processes, and the advancement of commercial technology.

On 18 January, while Atlantis was docked to Mir, Grunsfeld placed a telephone call to the NPR show Car Talk, hosted by two of Grunsfeld's fellow MIT alumni, Tom and Ray Magliozzi.

First Shuttle flight of 1997 highlighted by return of U.S. astronaut John Blaha to Earth after 118-day stay aboard Russian Space Station Mir and the largest transfer to date of logistics between the two spacecraft. Atlantis also returned carrying the first plants to complete a life cycle in space — a crop of wheat grown from seed to seed. This fifth of nine planned dockings continued Phase 1B of the NASA/Russian Space Agency cooperative effort, with Linenger becoming the third U.S. astronaut in succession to live on Mir. Same payload configuration flown on previous docking flight — featuring SPACEHAB Double module — flown again.

Blaha joined Mir 22 crew of Commander Valeri Korzun and Flight Engineer Aleksandr Kaleri on 19 September 1996, when he arrived there with the crew of STS-79. Linenger worked with the Mir 22 crew until the arrival in February of the Mir 23 crew of Commander Vasili Tsibliev, Flight Engineer Aleksandr Lazutkin and German researcher Reinhold Ewald. Ewald returned to Earth with the Mir 22 cosmonauts after a brief stay on the station. Astronaut Michael Foale replaced Linenger on Mir when the STS-84 mission arrived in May 1997.

Docking occurred at 22:55 EST, 14 January, followed by hatch opening at 00:57 January 15. Linenger officially traded places at 04:45 with Blaha who spent 118 days on the station and 128 days total on-orbit. About  of materials returned with Atlantis from Mir.

Crew also tested on Shuttle the Treadmill Vibration Isolation and Stabilization System (TVIS), designed for use in the Russian Service Module of the International Space Station. Another activity related to International Space Station involved firing the orbiter's small vernier jet thrusters during mated operations to gather engineering data.

Undocking occurred at 09:15 EST, 19 January, followed by fly around of Mir.

No significant in-flight anomalies were experienced with Atlantis.

Wake-up calls 
NASA began a tradition of playing music to astronauts during the Gemini program, which was first used to wake up a flight crew during Apollo 15.
Each track is specially chosen, often by their families, and usually has a special meaning to an individual member of the crew, or is applicable to their daily activities.

See also

List of human spaceflights
List of Space Shuttle missions
Outline of space science

References

External links
 NASA mission summary 
 STS-81 Video Highlights 

Spacecraft launched in 1997
STS-081